The 1920 All England Championships was a badminton tournament held at the Royal Horticultural Hall, Westminster, England from 2 March to 7 March 1920. It was the first All England Championships since 1914 following a six year break because of World War I.

George Thomas played under the alias George Allen and finally won his first men's singles title after many years of trying, his best previous singles result was as a losing finalist 16 years earlier in 1904. Another player Archibald Engelbach played under the alias Archibald Fee and won the doubles with Raoul du Roveray.

K. S. Tann was listed as representing China in the first round of the men's singles and was beaten by the defending champion Guy Sautter 15-1, 15-3. It was the first instance of a Chinese player appearing at the Championships. Tann partnered by Mackinnon also made it to the semi finals of the men's doubles.

Final results

+ alias

Men's singles

Women's singles

Men's doubles

Women's doubles

+ alias

Mixed doubles

References

All England Open Badminton Championships
All England
All England Open Badminton Championships in London
All England Championships
All England Badminton Championships
All England Badminton Championships